Brian Cummings (born 1948) is an American voice actor.

Brian Cummings may also refer to:

Brian Cummings (academic), English professor
Brian Cummings (American football) (born 1975), American football player